Ben Hall and his Gang is a 1911 Australian film about the bushranger Ben Hall, played by John Gavin, who also directed. It is considered a lost film.

Plot
The adventures of bushranger Ben Hall, including:
 Ben Hall's home.
 My Child! My Child! You Have No Mother
 Ben Gambling to Forget his Sorrows.
 Ben Hall arrested.
 His First Crime.
 Ben Hall's sensational escape from Bathurst Gaol.
 Sticking up three police disguised as shearers.
 Ben Hall's first robbery under arms.
 Sticking up the Eugowra Mail.
 Black Bob shot.
 The Trooper's leap for life.
 Hall meeting his false friend.
 The Wages of Sin.

Cast
The characters included:
 Ben Hall
 Gilbert
 Vane
 O'Meally
 Dunne

Production
This was the first film Gavin made for the producing team of Stanley Crick and Herbert Finlay after ending his association with H. A. Forsyth and Southern Cross Film Enterprises. Gavin publicly announced he had left Southern Cross in advertising for the film.

Crick and Finlay were based out of offices at 75 York St Sydney.

Reception
The film performed well at the box office.

Gavin went on to make three more films for Crick and Finlay (Frank Gardiner, the King of the Road (1911), Keane of Kalgoorlie (1911), The Assigned Servant (1911)), and one for their new company, the Australian Photo-Play Company (The Mark of the Lash (1911)).

References

External links
 
 

1911 films
1911 Western (genre) films
1911 lost films
Australian black-and-white films
Bushranger films
Films directed by John Gavin
Films set in colonial Australia
Films set in the 1860s
Lost Australian films
Lost Western (genre) films
Silent Australian Western (genre) films
Silent drama films